Ernest Bertrand Boland OP (born July 10, 1925) is an American Roman Catholic bishop.

Boland was born in Providence, Rhode Island. Boland went to Providence College and joined the Dominican order in 1949. He was ordained to the priesthood on June 9, 1955. He was a high school teacher in Columbus, Ohio. He was appointed bishop of the Roman Catholic Diocese of Multan, Pakistan and was consecrated on May 17, 1966. Boland served as bishop of the Multan Diocese until 1984. He has lived at Providence College since 1995 and has assisted the bishop of the Roman Catholic Diocese of Providence.

Notes

1925 births
Living people
Clergy from Providence, Rhode Island
Providence College alumni
Roman Catholic Diocese of Providence
American Dominicans
20th-century Roman Catholic bishops in Pakistan
Dominican bishops
Roman Catholic bishops of Multan
20th-century American Roman Catholic priests